Bridge between Guilford and Hamilton Townships is a historic multi-span stone arch bridge located at Guilford Township and Hamilton Township in Franklin County, Pennsylvania. It was constructed before 1860. It crosses Conococheague Creek.

It was listed on the National Register of Historic Places in 1982.

References 

Road bridges on the National Register of Historic Places in Pennsylvania
Bridges in Franklin County, Pennsylvania
National Register of Historic Places in Franklin County, Pennsylvania
Stone arch bridges in the United States